The Best of Luck is a 1920 American silent drama film directed by Ray C. Smallwood and starring Kathryn Adams, Jack Holt and Lila Leslie. It was adapted from a British play which had been a hit in the West End. A young American woman moves to Scotland and purchases an ancestral castle. She is pursued by two suitors, one a British nobleman and the other an underhand Spaniard.

Cast
 Kathryn Adams as Leslie MacLeod 
 Jack Holt as Kenneth, Lord Glenayr 
 Lila Leslie as Lady Blanche Westamere 
 Fred Malatesta as Lanzana 
 Frances Raymond as The Countess of Strathcaird 
 Emmett King as Blake, an American attorney 
 Robert Dunbar as The General 
 Effie Conley as Maid 
 John Underhill as The Footman

References

Bibliography
 Goble, Alan. The Complete Index to Literary Sources in Film. Walter de Gruyter, 1999.

External links
 

1920 films
1920 drama films
1920s English-language films
American silent feature films
Silent American drama films
Films directed by Ray C. Smallwood
American black-and-white films
Metro Pictures films
Films set in Scotland
1920s American films